"The Great Pretender" is a 1955 song written by Buck Ram and originally recorded by the Platters.

The Great Pretender may also refer to:

Film and television
 Great Pretenders (film), a 1991 Hong Kong comedy directed by Ronny Yu
 The Great Pretender (film), a 2018 drama directed by Nathan Silver
 The Great Pretender (game show), a 2007 British daytime game show
 Great Pretender (TV series), a 2020 Japanese anime series
 Great Pretenders, a 1999–2001 American music game show hosted by Wild Orchid

Music
 The Great Pretender (Dolly Parton album), 1984
 The Great Pretender (Freddie Mercury album), 1992
 The Great Pretender (Lester Bowie album), 1981
 The Great Pretenders, an album by Mini Mansions, 2015
 "The Great Pretender", a song by Avatar from Avatar, 2009
 "The Great Pretender", a song by Brian Eno from Taking Tiger Mountain (By Strategy), 1974
 "The Great Pretender", a song by the Jon Frederik Band from Yu-Gi-Oh! The Movie: Pyramid of Light, 2004

Other meanings
 The Great Pretender: The Undercover Mission That Changed Our Understanding of Madness, 2019 book by Susannah Cahalan

See also
 The great imitator, a number of medical conditions that can look like other health problems
 Pretender (disambiguation)